The 1948 PGA Championship was the 30th PGA Championship, held May 19–25 at Norwood Hills Country Club in St. Louis, Missouri. Ben Hogan won the match play championship, 7 & 6 over Mike Turnesa in the Tuesday final; the winner's share was $3,500 and the runner-up's was $1,500.

It was Hogan's second and final PGA Championship victory and the second of his nine major titles; the first was a 6 & 4 win in 1946 at Portland, and the third came a few weeks later at the U.S. Open at Riviera. Following a near-fatal auto accident in early 1949, his debilitated condition did not agree with the grueling five-day schedule of 36 holes per day in summer heat. Hogan did not enter the PGA Championship again until 1960, its third year as a 72-hole stroke play event, at 18 holes per day.

Defending champion Jim Ferrier lost in the second round to semifinalist Claude Harmon, 1 up. Harmon defeated Sam Snead in 42 holes in the quarterfinals, but was stopped by Turnesa in 37 holes in the next round.

Hogan became only the second of four players in history to win the U.S. Open and the PGA Championship in the same calendar year. He was preceded by Gene Sarazen in 1922 and followed by Jack Nicklaus in 1980. Through 2016, Tiger Woods is the last to win both, in 2000, part of his Tiger Slam of four consecutive majors.

Format
The match play format at the PGA Championship in 1948 called for 12 rounds (216 holes) in seven days:
 Wednesday and Thursday – 36-hole stroke play qualifier, 18 holes per day;
defending champion Jim Ferrier and top 63 professionals advanced to match play
 Friday – first two rounds, 18 holes each
 Saturday – third round – 36 holes
 Sunday – quarterfinals – 36 holes
 Monday – semifinals – 36 holes
 Tuesday – final – 36 holes

Past champions in the field

Failed to qualify

Source:

Final results
Tuesday, May 25, 1948

Final eight bracket

Final match scorecards
Morning

Afternoon

Source:

References

External links
PGA Media Guide 2012
PGA.com – 1948 PGA Championship – Hogan's Last Stand

PGA Championship
Golf in Missouri
Sports in St. Louis
PGA Championship
PGA Championship
PGA Championship
PGA Championship